Rho-related GTP-binding protein RhoJ is a protein that in humans is encoded by the RHOJ gene.

ARHJ belongs to the Rho family of small GTP-binding proteins. Rho proteins regulate the dynamic assembly of cytoskeletal components for several physiologic processes, such as cell proliferation and motility and the establishment of cell polarity. They are also involved in pathophysiologic process, such as cell transformation and metastasis.[supplied by OMIM]

References

Further reading